Alice Howell (born Alice Florence Clark; May 20, 1886 – April 12, 1961) was a silent film comedy actress from New York City. She was the mother of actress Yvonne Howell.

Biography
Early reviews of her movies describe her as "the scream of the screen". One reviewer likened her to a "sort of Charlie Chaplin, Douglas Fairbanks, Sr., and Max Linder."  All this was compressed into "one more or less diminutive package of femininity". Sometimes called "the girl Charlie Chaplin", she worked for Mack Sennett and later L-KO Kompany. Her early comedies were often produced by Universal Pictures.

Career 

At Mack Sennett's Keystone Film Company, Howell quickly worked her way up from crowd scenes to featured parts in shorts such as Charlie Chaplin's Laughing Gas (1914 film), and starred in at least one, Shot in the Excitement (1914). Hired away by Sennett's former second-in-command, Henry Lehrman, when he set up the L-KO Kompany, Howell was cast to support Billie Ritchie and became popular in her own one-reelers. By 1917, she was such an audience favorite that Julius and Abe Stern formed Century Comedies to showcase her talents, making her, along with Mabel Normand and Marie Dressler, the third comedienne to have her own exclusive production unit. After Howell and Century parted ways in 1919, the company continued turning out comedy shorts and was renamed Stern Brothers Comedies in 1926. in 1919, Howell moved to the independent Emerald Company, which became part of the Reelcraft Corporation and released her still extant film, Distilled Love (1920). Howell's last starring series was a group of 1924–25 domestic comedies for Universal Pictures featuring a married couple and their goofy butler. When this series ended, she appeared in one last short, Madame Dynamite (1926), for Fox Film Corporation.

Among more than 100 screen credits, Howell made such motion pictures as Caught in a Cabaret (1914), Mabel and Fatty's Married Life (1915), Neptune's Naughty Daughter (1917), Green Trees (1924), and Madame Dynamite (1926). Her Bareback Career (1917) was the first of 12 two-reel comedies for a new corporation which was formed to manufacture and distribute Alice Howell comedies.

In this era, such female slapstick stars as Howell, Dorothy Devore, and Billie Rhodes were inhibited by second-rate films and the absence of genuine star buildup.

Howell's film career continued into the sound-movie era with a role as a mute servant of the master murderer in the motion picture The Black Ace (1933).

Death 
Howell died in Los Angeles, California, in 1961, aged 74.

Partial filmography
 Tillie's Punctured Romance (1914) as Guest (uncredited)
 Bombs and Bangs (1914)
 Lover's Luck (1914)
 Laughing Gas (1914)
 Caught in the Rain (1914)
 Shot in the Excitement (1914)
Caught in a Cabaret (1914)
 Mabel and Fatty's Married Life (1915)
 Father was a Loafer (1915)
 Under new Management (1915)
 How Stars are Made (1916)
 Her Bareback Career (1917)
 Neptune's Naughty Daughter (1917) 
 In Dutch (1918)
 Distilled Love (1920)
 His Wooden Legacy (1920)
 Her Lucky Day (1920)
 Cinderella Slippers (1920)
 A Convict's Happy Bride (1920)
 Love Is an Awful Thing (1922)
 Wandering Daughters (1923)
 Green Trees (1924)
 The Pride of the Force (1925)
 Under a Spell (1925)
 Madame Dynamite (1926)

References

Cedar Rapids, Iowa Republican, At The Theaters, October 8, 1926, Page 3.
Elyria, Ohio Chronicle Telegram, Public Will Always Love Laughmakers, July 6, 1978, Page 24.
Janesville, Wisconsin Daily Gazette, News Notes From Movieland, August 31, 1917, Page 6.
Los Angeles Times, Book Alice Howell Comedies-Superba, September 23, 1917, Page III17.
Los Angeles Times, Actress Gets Half Job, March 24, 1933, Page 7.
Slide, Anthony: She Could Be Chaplin!: The Comedic Brilliance of Alice Howell. Jackson: University Press of Mississippi, 2016.

External links

Alice Howell at Women Film Pioneers Project
Alice Howell at Virtual History
Alice Howell DVD Project at Kickstarter

1886 births
1961 deaths
American silent film actresses
Actresses from New York City
Burials at Forest Lawn Memorial Park (Hollywood Hills)
Silent film comedians
20th-century American actresses
20th-century American comedians
Comedians from New York City
Women film pioneers